Abacetus abacillus is a species of ground beetle in the subfamily Pterostichinae. It was described by Kolbe in 1898.

The species is found in Africa, distributed in Ethiopia and Zambia, and has two intraspecific taxa Abacetus abacillus abacillus Kolbe, 1898 and Abacetus abacillus dollmanni Straneo, 1949.

References

abacillus
Beetles described in 1898
Insects of East Africa
Insects of Southern Africa